is a Japanese film based on Tetsuya Honda's detective novel by the same name. It was released in theaters on 23 January 2013.

Cast
 Yūko Takeuchi as Reiko Himekawa 
 Takao Osawa as Isao Makita 
 Hidetoshi Nishijima as Kazuo Kikuta 
 Keisuke Koide
 Ryuhei Maruyama
 Tetsuya Takeda
 Tomokazu Miura 
 Shota Sometani 
 Ken Kaneko 
 Nobuaki Kaneko
 Goro Ibuki
 Renji Ishibashi 
 Tetsushi Tanaka

References

External links
 Official website 
 

Films based on Japanese novels
2013 films
Films directed by Yūichi Satō
Tokyo Metropolitan Police Department in fiction
Films scored by Yuki Hayashi
2010s Japanese films